Hasanabad (also Romanized as Ḩasanābād; also known as Ḩoseynābād) is a village in Khesht Rural District, Khesht District, Kazerun County, Fars Province, Iran. At the 2006 census, its population was 30, in 6 families.

References 

Populated places in Kazerun County